Juan Francisco Alemany Marín (born 12 November 1963) is a Spanish former handball player. He was a member of the Spain men's national handball team. He was part of the  team at the 1992 Summer Olympics, playing six matches.

References

1963 births
Living people
Spanish male handball players
Handball players at the 1992 Summer Olympics
Olympic handball players of Spain
People from Valencia